João Lima (born 20 September 1961) is a Portuguese hurdler. He competed in the men's 110 metres hurdles at the 1988 Summer Olympics.

References

External links
 

1961 births
Living people
Athletes (track and field) at the 1988 Summer Olympics
Portuguese male hurdlers
Olympic athletes of Portugal
Sportspeople from Luanda
Portuguese sportspeople of Angolan descent